Syndecans are single transmembrane domain proteins that are thought to act as coreceptors, especially for G protein-coupled receptors. More specifically, these core proteins carry three to five heparan sulfate and chondroitin sulfate chains, i.e. they are proteoglycans, which allow for interaction with a large variety of ligands including fibroblast growth factors, vascular endothelial growth factor, transforming growth factor-beta, fibronectin and antithrombin-1. Interactions between fibronectin and some syndecans can be modulated by the extracellular matrix protein tenascin C.

Family members and Structure
The syndecan protein family has four members. Syndecans 1 and 3 and syndecans 2 and 4, making up separate subfamilies, arose by gene duplication and divergent evolution from a single ancestral gene. 
The syndecan numbers reflect the order in which the cDNAs for each family member were cloned. All syndecans have an N-terminal signal peptide, an ectodomain, a single hydrophobic transmembrane domain, and a short C-terminal cytoplasmic domain. All syndecans are anchored to plasma membrane via a 24-25 amino acid long hydrophobic transmembrane domain, in contrast to another type of cell surface proteoglycans that attaches to cell membrane using a glycosyl-phosphatidyl-inositol linkage. The most obvious differences between syndecans include
(together with differences in distribution) the subclassification
of the family depending on the existence of GAG binding
sites either at both ends of the ectodomain (syndecan-1 and -
3) or at the distal part only (syndecan-2 and -4) and a relatively
long Thr-Ser-Pro-rich area in the middle of syndecan-
3’s ectodomain. The ectodomains show the least amount of amino acid sequence conservation, not more than 10–20%; in contrast, the transmembrane and cytoplasmic domains share approximately 60–70% amino acid sequence identity.
The transmembrane domains contain an unusual alanine/glycine sequence motif, while the cytoplasmic domain is essentially composed of two regions of conserved amino acid sequence (C1 and C2), separated by a central variable sequence of amino acids that is distinct for each family member (V).

In mammalian cells, syndecans are expressed by unique genes located on different chromosomes. This is general lack of evidence of alternate splicing in syndecan genes. All members of the syndecan family have 5 exons. The difference in size of the syndecans is credited to the variable length of exon 3, which encodes a spacer domain [1, 14]. In humans, the amino acid length of syndecan 1, 2, 3 and 4 is 310, 201, 346 and 198 respectively. Glycosaminoglycan chains, a member of the heparan sulfate group, are an important component of syndecan and are responsible for a diverse set of syndecan functions. The addition of glycosaminoglycans to syndecan is controlled by a series of post- translation events. The preferential site for the addition of glycosaminoglycans is on a serine residue followed by glycine residue, where the linker is attached for the elongation of the glycosaminoglycans by α-N-acetylglucosaminyltransferase I [1]. The linker is composed of four saccharides, first one being xylose, which is an unusual sugar in a unique place, attached to serine of the protein core and sequentially followed by two galactose and a  β-D-glucuronic acid [1, 12].

Expression
Syndecans are expressed on the cell surface in a cell-specific manner. For example, in mouse cells and tissues, syndecan 1 is highly expressed in fibroblastic and epithelial cells. It is especially high in keratinocytes whereas low in endothelial and neural cells. These tissues include skin, liver, kidney and lungs. Syndecan 2 is highly expressed in endothelial, neural, and fibroblastic cells, whereas it has low expression levels in epithelial cells. It is specific to tissues such as the liver, endothelia and fibroblasts. Syndecan 3 is highly expressed in neural cells, but has low or undetectable amount in epithelial cells. In tissues, it is specific to the brain and expressed at low levels in liver, kidney, lung and small intestine. Syndecan 4 is highly expressed by epithelial and fibroblastic cells, but has low expression levels in neural and endothelial cells. In tissues, it is preferentially expressed in the liver and lungs [11].

Functions
Functionality of syndecan is contributed by glycosaminoglycans which help in the interaction with different extracellular ligands. Depending upon the cellular localization of syndecan, glycosaminoglycans have different structures to accommodate the functional needs of the region. The syndecans are known to form homologous oligomers that may be important for their functions.

Functions of syndecan can be categorized in four ways.  First is growth-factor-receptor activation.  Glycosaminoglycans attached to the syndecan help binding of the various growth factors for activation of important cellular signaling mechanisms. Growth factors such as FGF2, HGF, EGF, VEGF, neuregulins and others interact with syndecans [1, 2, 8]. For example, at the site of tissue injury, the soluble syndecan-1 ectodomains are cleaved by heparanases, producing heparin-like fragments that activate bFGF [13].  Whereas most growth factors interact with syndecans via heparan sulfate chains, the prosecretory mitogen lacritin requires heparanase to both expose and create a binding site in the N-terminus of syndecan 1.

Second is matrix adhesion.  Syndecans bind to structural extracellular matrix molecules such as collagens I, III, V, fibronectin, thrombospondin, and tenascin to provide structural support for the adhesion [1, 2].

A third function is cell–cell adhesion.  Evidence for syndecan’s role in cell–cell adhesion comes from the human myeloma cell line. These myeloma cells had a deficiency in the ability to adhere to one another in a rotation-mediated aggregation matrix. This deficiency is attributed to the lack of syndecan 1 expression. Syndecan 4 also interacts with integrin proteins for cell–cell adhesion [1, 2, 12].

A final role is in tumor suppression and progression. Syndecans act as tumor inhibitors by preventing cellular proliferation of tumor cell lines. For example, in the epithelial-derived tumor cell line, S115, the syndecan 1 ectodomain suppresses the growth of S115 cells without affecting the growth of normal epithelial cells [7]. However, syndecan 1 expression also has a role in tumor progression in myeloma and other cancers [5, 6, 9, 15].
It associates with intracellular actin cytoskeleton and helps maintain normal epithelium sheet morphology

Protein Domains
The syndecan proteins can contain the following protein domains,
A signal sequence;
An extracellular domain (ectodomain) of variable length whose sequence is not evolutionarily conserved in the various forms of syndecans. The ectodomain contains the sites of attachment of the heparan sulphate glycosaminoglycan side chains;
A transmembrane region;
A highly conserved cytoplasmic domain of about 30 to 35 residues, which could interact with cytoskeletal proteins.

Clinical significance

Endometriosis
Syndecan-4 is upregulated in endometriosis and inhibition of syndecan-4 in human endometriotic cells results in a reduction of invasive growth in vitro and changes in matrix metalloproteinase expression.

Osteoarthritis
Syndecan-4 is upregulated in osteoarthritis and inhibition of syndecan-4 reduces cartilage destruction in mouse models of OA.

Metabolic regulation and body composition 
The Drosophila homologue dSdc and human SDC4 have been implicated in energy homeostasis.

Multiple Myeloma
Syndecan1 is upregulated in multiple myeloma.  High levels of shed syndecan1 in a patient's serum typically is correlated with poor prognosis.

Syndecan 1 is the most studied of all the syndecans in cancer research. Many studies have shown that syndecan 1 plays an important role in cancer progression, and also can be used as cancer biomarker. For example, syndecan 1 expression is higher in the bone marrow of the patients suffering from the multiple myeloma [9]. In one published study, the cells expressing the soluble syndecan 1 ectodomain promoted the growth and metastasis of B-lymphoid tumors more extensively than cells bearing surface syndecan 1 or lacking syndecan 1 expression [16]. Similarly, syndecan 1 expression has been linked with low differentiation in squamous cell carcinoma of the head and neck [15].

Syndecan 1 also has been linked with cancer progression by mediating the effects of growth factors in the cells. For example, syndecan 1 expression is increased in ductal breast carcinomas and is associated with factors of angiogenesis and lymphangiogenesis [5]. Studies from patients suffering from endometrial cancer have shown that these patients have increased syndecan 1 expression, and also that expression of this protein positively regulates the endometrial hyperplasia that can progress to endometrial cancer [6].

References

External links
 MBInfo: Syndecans

Proteoglycans
Single-pass transmembrane proteins